Sastre (which means tailor in Spanish) is a surname. Notable people with the surname include:

 Alfonso Sastre, (1926–2021), Spanish playwright
 Antonio Sastre, (1911–1987), Argentinian footballer
 Carlos Sastre, (born 1975), Spanish cyclist
Eduardo Sastre (1910–?), Argentine fencer
 Elvira Sastre, (born 1992), Spanish poet
Ernesto Sastre (born 1926), Colombian fencer
Fernand Sastre (1923–1998), French football official
 Inés Sastre, (born 1973), Spanish model and actress
Inés Sastre de Jesús (born 1955), Puerto Rican botanist
Jaume Sastre (born 1959), Spanish teacher, writer and activist
Joan Sastre (born 1991), Spanish basketball player
Joan Sastre (footballer) (born 1997), Spanish footballer
Josep Sastre (1906–1962), Spanish footballer
 Lluís Sastre, (born 1986), Spanish footballer
 Marcos Sastre, (1808-1897), Argentinian-Uruguayan writer
 Martin Sastre, (born 1976), Uruguayan media artist
Óscar Sastre (1920–2012), Argentine footballer
Peggy Sastre (born 1981), French journalist
Rafel Sastre (born 1975), Spanish footballer
Tià Sastre (born 1994), Spanish footballer

See also
 Sastre, Santa Fe

Occupational surnames
Spanish-language surnames